The supposed Lady Macbeth effect or Macbeth effect is an alleged priming effect said to occur when response to a cleaning cue is increased after having been induced by a feeling of shame. The effect is named after the Lady Macbeth character in the Shakespeare play Macbeth; she imagined bloodstains on her hands after committing murder.

Background
In one experiment, different groups of participants were asked to recall a good or bad past deed, after which they were asked to fill in the letters of three incomplete words: "W_ _H", "SH_ _ER" and "S_ _P". Those who had been asked to recall a bad deed were about 60% more likely to respond with cleansing-related words like "wash", "shower" and "soap" instead of alternatives such as "wish", "shaker" or "stop".

In another experiment, experimenters were able to reduce choice-supportive bias by having subjects engage in forms of self-cleaning.

The effect is apparently localized enough that those who had been asked to lie verbally preferred an oral cleaning product and those asked to lie in writing preferred a hand cleaning product over the other kind of cleanser and other control items.

Other researchers have been unable to replicate the basic effect using larger samples. Replication difficulties have emerged for three out of four of Zhong and Liljenquist's original studies (i.e., Study 2, Study 3, and Study 4). A meta-analysis of 15 studies examining the relationship between primes related to moral threat and cleansing preferences found a small effect, with no significant relationship evident across 11 studies conducted by researchers other than the original ones.

See also

 Ritual purification
 Self-licensing

References

Cognitive biases
Moral psychology